English Grove Lake is a lake in Douglas County, in the U.S. state of Minnesota.

English Grove Lake was named for the nearby groves of settler William T. English.

See also
List of lakes in Minnesota

References

Lakes of Minnesota
Lakes of Douglas County, Minnesota